The Léon Thévenin is a French cable-laying vessel named in honor of French engineer Léon Charles Thévenin.

The Léon Thévenin was famously used in conjunction with a robot submarine named  Scarab 1 for recovering the flight data recorder (FDR) and cockpit voice recorder (CVR) boxes from Air India Flight 182 that was destroyed in mid-air by a bomb as it was crossing Irish airspace, on 23 June 1985.

By 4 July, the sonar of the British ship Guardline Locater had detected signals on the seabed and on 9 July the CVR was pin-pointed and raised to the surface by the Scarab 1. The next day the FDR was located and recovered.

It is currently owned and operated by Orange Marine, operating out of the Port of Cape Town, and replacing the function of the CS Chamarel, which was previously stationed there to service African undersea fiber cables.

References

Cable laying ships
Ships of France
1983 ships